Menekşe is a village in the District of Yüreğir, Adana Province, Turkey.

References

Villages in Yüreğir District